Pomodorino di Manduria (Little Tomato of Manduria) is an ecotype of tomato typical of Manduria, a city in the province of Taranto. In the local dialect, it is also called Pummitoru paisanu.

Origins 

Tomatoes are used in many Apulian traditional dishes like friselle or some typical recipe with pasta, meat and fish. The region hosts at least four traditional varieties of tomato.

Characteristics 

These tomatoes are cultivated in little plots of land (1/2 - 2 hectares). They are sown in March and harvested from the second half of June to the first days of September. This ecotype does not need any trimming or pruning operation. The fruit weight is between 10 and 25 grams.

From some researches, it has been discovered that this ecotype is very resistant to the Tomato spotted wilt virus (TSWV) and with a graft that this tolerance is also transmitted to other varieties.

This table is about dried tomatoes in oil (for 100 grams).

Geography 
Pomodorino di Manduria is grown in Manduria and Maruggio and, to a lesser extent, also in Sava, Avetrana and Lizzano. These cities and villages are located in deep loamy territories called Terre ti patuli. Near the Ionian Sea in the areas of San Pietro in Bevagna and Campomarino, the tomatoes are cultivated without the need for irrigation, while in the inland called "Terre rosse, two-three irrigation operations are needed in June.

Cuisine 
Tomatoes are eaten fresh during summer with friselle or in salads with the barattiere di Manduria. Another use is for the production of the homemade tomato sauce or for making the dried tomatoes in oil. The main typical recipe is the "Jatedda", a salad with fresh tomatoes, garlic, "Terra d'Otranto" extra-virgin olive oil, salt, capers and oregano; usually it is served with slices of homemade dry bread.

Designation of origin 
The Italian Ministry of Agricultural, Food and Forestry Policies has recognised Pomodorino di Manduria as Traditional Food Product (Prodotto Agroalimentare Tradizionale PAT) of Apulia.

See also 
Apulia
Italian cuisine
Pomodoro di Pachino
San Marzano tomato
Taranto

References 

Tomato cultivars